Peter Fitzek (born 12 August 1965) is a German political activist associated with the Reichsbürgerbewegung ('"Reich Citizens' Movement'), a movement contesting the legitimacy of the current German state, the Federal Republic of Germany.

Fitzek has proclaimed himself "King of Germany" of "NeuDeutschland", which consists of several properties around the city of Wittenberg, south of Berlin. His movement claims with 3,100 members, its own currency, a bank, and social security. In 2016, Fitzek was sentenced to three months in prison for traffic offences, and his premises were searched by police in the course of a financial regulation investigation. In 2017, Fitzek was sentenced to three years and eight months in prison for operating a bank without a license and embezzling his clients' money, though the conviction was later quashed. The group has been under surveillance by German intelligence services, who consider the group a potential threat.

In 2022, his group purchased land in Saxony with which they intend to create their own state. Also in that year, he claimed to have 5,000 members of his group, now identifying himself as Peter I of the Kingdom of Germany.

See also 
 Martin Stephan

References

External links

German activists
1965 births
Living people
People convicted of embezzlement
Sovereign citizen movement individuals
German monarchists